Shakthi TV (Tamil:சக்தி ) is the first Tamil television service of Sri Lanka. It is the number one Tamil station in Sri Lanka. This general entertainment channel broadcasts serials, films, sports, current affairs, news and children's programs. It mainly airs programs from Sun TV (India).Shakthi TV is available worldwide through YuppTV.

Frequency and coverage
Shakthi TV broadcasts on a UHF frequency from 05.00 to 00.00.

Programming

References

Citations

MTV Channel
Tamil-language television stations in Sri Lanka
Television channels and stations established in 1998